Banassac-Canilhac is a commune in the department of Lozère, southern France. The municipality was established on 1 January 2016 by merger of the former communes of Banassac and Canilhac.

References

See also 
Communes of the Lozère department

Communes of Lozère